Klavan is an Estonian surname. Notable people with the surname include:

Andrew Klavan (born 1954), American author and screenwriter
Dzintar Klavan (born 1961), Estonian footballer
Gene Klavan (1924–2004), American DJ, columnist and author
Ragnar Klavan (born 1985), Estonian footballer

Estonian-language surnames